Senator Gutman may refer to:

Alberto Gutman (1959–2019), Florida State Senate
Daniel Gutman (1901–1993), New York State Senate
Phillip E. Gutman (1930–2017), Indiana State Senate